The 82d Expeditionary Air Support Operations Squadron is a provisional United States Air Force unit located at Camp Buehring, Kuwait.  The squadron was first organized in 1969 as the 82d Tactical Control Flight, an element of the Tactical Air Control System.  It was inactivated in 1988, but was converted to provisional status in 2009 and has since served in the Global War on Terror.

Mission
The 82d Expeditionary Air Support Operations Squadron is a combat support unit.  The squadron provides tactical command and control of airpower assets for the Joint Forces Air Component Commander in support of the Joint Forces Commander in combat operations.

History

Lineage
 Constituted as the 82d Tactical Control Flight on 24 June 1969
 Activated on 25 June 1969
 Inactivated on 31 March 1988
 Redesignated 82d Expeditionary Air Support Operations Squadron and converted to provisional status on 12 Feb 2009.
 Activated by July 2010

Assignments
 4468th Tactical Control Squadron, 25 June 1969
 609th Tactical Control Squadron, 15 October 1969
 727th Tactical Control Squadron, 1 June 1976
 602d Tactical Air Control Wing, 1 March 1977 - 31 March 1988
 Air Combat Command to activate or inactivate at any time on or after 12 February 2009
 368th Expeditionary Air Support Operations Group, by July 2010
 386th Air Expeditionary Wing, c. 18 December 2011

Stations
 McConnell Air Force Base, Kansas, 25 June 1969
 Holloman Air Force Base, New Mexico, 15 January 1973 – 31 Mar 1988
 Camp Victory, Iraq, by July 2010
 Camp Buehring, Kuwait, by May 2014

References

 Notes

External links
 
 
 
 

Air support operations squadrons of the United States Air Force